Smeep Kang is an Indian actor, film producer and director who works in Punjabi and Hindi cinema. He graduated from Punjab University, Chandigarh with a degree in chemical engineering. He is well known for directing the Punjabi comedy films Chak De Phatte (2008), Carry On Jatta (2012), Lucky Di Unlucky Story (2013).

Directing career
Despite directing films such as Meri Vahuti Da Viyah (2007) and Chak De Phatte (2008), Smeep Kang rose to popularity as a director in 2012 with the comedy film Carry On Jatta, which became a Blockbuster, and also one of the highest-grossing Punjabi feature films of that year. He again teamed up with most of the cast of Carry On Jatta in 2013, with comedy film Lucky Di Unlucky Story. This film also became a box office success. Following this, he directed Bhaji in Problem, which managed to do good business at the box office but wasn't as successful as his last two films.

Filmography

References

External links
 Smeep Kang on CinePunjab.com

Living people
1961 births
Indian male film actors
Indian film directors
Indian film producers
Male actors from Punjab, India
Film directors from Punjab, India
Film producers from Punjab, India